The eighth series of Dancing with the Stars premiered on 14 April 2019 on Three, and is hosted by Dai Henwood and Sharyn Casey. Camilla Sacre-Dallerup, Julz Tocker, and Rachel White all returned as the series' judges, with Sacre-Dullerup serving as head judge again. The full cast was announced on 4 April.

Cast

Couples

Scorecard 

 Red numbers indicate the couples with the lowest score for each week.
 Green numbers indicate the couples with the highest score for each week.
  indicates the couples eliminated that week.
  indicates the returning couple that finished in the bottom two.
  the returning couple that was the last to be called safe.
  indicates the winning couple.
  indicates the runner-up couple.
  indicates the couple who placed third.
  indicates the couple who placed fourth.

Average score chart 
This table only counts for dances scored on a 30-point scale.

Highest and lowest scoring performances 
The best and worst performances in each dance according to the judges' 30-point scale are as follows:

Couples' highest and lowest scoring dances 
Scores are based upon a potential 30-point maximum (team dances are excluded).

Weekly scores 
Individual judges' scores in the charts below (given in parentheses) are listed in this order from left to right: Rachel White, Camilla Sacre-Dallerup, Julz Tocker.

Week 1 
All voting proceeds from this week went to the Our People, Our City Fund to help support the families and Muslim communities impacted by the Christchurch mosque shootings. From the second week onwards, all proceeds went to the celebrity contestant's charity of choice.

 Running order (Night 1)

 Running order (Night 2)

Week 2: Top 40 Week 

 Running order (Night 1)

 Running order (Night 2)

Week 3: Guilty Pleasures Week 

 Running order (Night 1)

 Running order  (Night 2)

Week 4: Club Night 

 Running order (Night 1)

Running order (Night 2)

Judges' vote to save

 White: K'Lee & Scott
 Tocker: K'Lee & Scott
 Sacre-Dallerup: Did not vote, but would have voted to save K'Lee & Scott

Week 5: 80s Week 

 Running order (Night 1)

 Running order (Night 2)

Judges' vote to save

 White: William & Amelia
 Tocker: William & Amelia
 Sacre-Dallerup: Did not vote, but would have voted to save William & Amelia

Week 6: Rock Week 

 Running order (Night 1)

 Running order (Night 2)

Judges' vote to save

 White: K'Lee & Scott
 Tocker: K'Lee & Scott
 Sacre-Dallerup: Did not vote, but would have voted to save K'Lee & Scott

Week 7: Rocketman Week 

 Running order  (Night 1)

 Running order (Night 2)

Judges' vote to save

 White: Laura & Shae
 Tocker: Laura & Shae
 Sacre-Dallerup: Did not vote, but would have voted to save Laura & Shae

Week 8: Celebrity Trio Week 

 Running order (Night 1)

 Running order  (Night 2)

Judges' vote to save

 White: Manu & Loryn
 Tocker: Glen & Vanessa
 Sacre-Dallerup: Manu & Loryn

Week 9: Semi-Final 

Running order

Judges' vote to save

 White: William & Amelia
 Tocker: William & Amelia
 Sacre-Dallerup: Did not vote, but would have voted to save William & Amelia

Week 10: Final 

Running order (Top 4)

Running order (Top 2)

Dance chart 

  Highest scoring dance
  Lowest scoring dance

References

series 8
2019 New Zealand television seasons